The Mayor of Stratford is the head of municipal government of Stratford District, New Zealand. The mayor is elected directly using the first-past-the-post electoral system. The current mayor is Neil Volzke.

History
The first Stratford Town Board was formed in 1882. The Stratford County Council was formed in 1890, and the Stratford Borough Council was formed on 22 July 1898. The county and borough councils amalgamated on 1 April 1989 to form the Stratford District Council, which was reconstituted on 1 November 1989 as part of the nationwide restructure in local government.

List of mayors of Stratford
Stratford has had 24 mayors:

List of deputy mayors of Stratford

References

 
Stratford